Pyruvate kinase PKLR is an enzyme that in humans is encoded by the PKLR gene.

The protein encoded by this gene is a pyruvate kinase that catalyzes the production of pyruvate and ATP from phosphoenolpyruvate. Defects in this enzyme, due to gene mutations or genetic variations, are the common cause of chronic hereditary nonspherocytic hemolytic anemia (CNSHA or HNSHA). Alternatively spliced transcript variants encoding distinct isoforms have been described.

Interactive pathway map

References

Further reading